César Muciño (28 February 1972 – 7 March 2003) was a Mexican cyclist. He competed in two events at the 1992 Summer Olympics.

References

1972 births
2003 deaths
Mexican male cyclists
Olympic cyclists of Mexico
Cyclists at the 1992 Summer Olympics
Place of birth missing